Aleksandra Vyacheslavovna Rebenok(born May 6, 1980, Moscow, RSFSR, USSR) is a Russian actress of theater, cinema and television presenter.

Biography 
Aleksandra was born May 6, 1980, in Moscow in the family of the candidate physical and mathematical sciences and technologies and designer clothes. In 1994 she graduated from the Children's Art School number 1. In 1997, she graduated from the educational complex (named after Galina Vishnevskaya) in piano.  From 1997 to 1999 she studied at the Moscow State Art and Cultural University, graduated from the 2nd year on the director's faculty on a specialty  the director of the theater.

In 2003, she graduated from the Boris Shchukin Theatre Institute,   where its artistic director was Rodion Ovchinnikov.  Ccollaborated with the Strastnoi Theater Center from 2003 to 2005. In 2005, leading to the O2TV Channel.

In 2005-2006 she studied at the Faculty of Journalism at Moscow State University.

Since 2006 - the actress Theater.doc. Since 2008 he collaborates with The Project Factory. In 2010, he starred in the TV series  School  (Valeriya Gai Germanika) and J-Factory (Chris Waitt).

In 2011, it became the leading program  Face Lifting. Russian Version   on   Muz-TV adaptation of British show Snog Marry Avoid? on BBC Three.

Selected filmography
  Dismissal (2004)
 Alice's Dream (2007)
 Glukhar (2008)
 Bride at any Cost (2009)
 Trace (2009)
  J-Factory (2010)
 Kulagin and partners (2010)
 School (2010)
Till Night Do Us Part (2011)
Goodbye, Mama (2013)
 Brothers Ch (2014)
 Island (2016)
 The Bride (2017)
 Acid (2018)
 Dead Lake (2019)
 Gold Diggers (2019)

References

External links

 

1980 births
Living people
Russian television actresses
Russian film actresses
Actresses from Moscow
Russian television presenters
Russian women television presenters